This article details the Toronto Wolfpack's rugby league football club's 2019 season. This is the Wolfpack's third season overall and second season in the RFL Championship.

Competitions

Pre-season friendlies

Championship

Table

Results

Play-offs

Squad statistics
As of 5 October

Transfers

In

Out

Milestones

Former Leeds Rhinos coach Brian McDermott has been named new Toronto Wolfpack head coach.

Round 1: Ricky Leutele, Joe Mellor, Bodene Thompson, Jon Wilkin, Tom Olbison and Gadwin Springer made their debuts for the Wolfpack.
Round 1: Joe Mellor scored his 1st try for the Wolfpack.
Round 2: Jacob Emmitt made his 50th appearance for the Wolfpack.
Round 2: Matty Russell scored his 1st four-try haul and 1st hat-trick for the Wolfpack.
Round 2: Ricky Leutele scored his 1st try for the Wolfpack.
Round 2: Gareth O'Brien reached 200 points for the Wolfpack.
Round 4: Anthony Mullally made his debut for the Wolfpack.
Round 4: Bodene Thompson scored his 1st try for the Wolfpack.
Round 5: Bob Beswick made his 50th appearance for the Wolfpack.
Round 6: Jack Logan made his debut for the Wolfpack.
Round 6: Blake Wallace made his 50th appearance for the Wolfpack.
Round 7: Brad Fash made his debut for the Wolfpack.
Round 7: Jack Logan and Jon Wilkin scored their 1st try for the Wolfpack.
Round 8: Andrew Dixon scored his 1st hat-trick for the Wolfpack.
Round 9: Andrew Dixon made his 50th appearance for the Wolfpack.
Round 9: Hakim Miloudi made his debut for the Wolfpack.
Round 9: Tom Olbison scored his 1st try for the Wolfpack.
Round 9: Blake Wallace kicked his 1st goal for the Wolfpack.
Round 10: Gareth O'Brien scored his 2nd hat-trick for the Wolfpack.
Round 10: Blake Wallace scored his 5th hat-trick for the Wolfpack.
Round 10: Blake Wallace reached 200 points for the Wolfpack.
Round 11: Matty Russell scored his 2nd hat-trick for the Wolfpack.
Round 11: Josh McCrone kicked his 1st drop goal for the Wolfpack.

Round 13: Gareth O'Brien kicked his 100th goal for the Wolfpack.
Round 14: Chase Stanley scored his 1st hat-trick for the Wolfpack.
Round 14: Gareth O'Brien reached 300 points for the Wolfpack.
Round 15: Liam Kay made his 50th appearance for the Wolfpack.
Round 16: Andrew Dixon scored his 25th try and reached 100 points for the Wolfpack.
Round 17: Anthony Mullally scored his 1st try for the Wolfpack.
Round 17: Matty Russell scored his 25th try and reached 100 points for the Wolfpack.
Round 19: Andy Ackers made his 50th appearance for the Wolfpack.
Round 20: Josh McCrone made his 50th appearance for the Wolfpack.
Round 20: Gareth O'Brien scored his 25th try for the Wolfpack.
Round 22: Josh McCrone and Hakim Miloudi kicked their 1st goal for the Wolfpack.
Round 23: Greg Worthington made his 50th appearance for the Wolfpack.
Round 23: Hakim Miloudi kicked his 1st drop goal for the Wolfpack.
Round 23: Nick Rawsthorne scored his 25th try and reached 100 points for the Wolfpack.
Round 24: Gareth O'Brien scored his 3rd hat-trick for the Wolfpack.
Round 24: Andy Ackers scored his 25th try and reached 100 points for the Wolfpack.
Round 24: Hakim Miloudi scored his 1st try for the Wolfpack.
Round 24: Gareth O'Brien reached 400 points for the Wolfpack.
Round 25: Matty Russell scored his 3rd hat-trick for the Wolfpack. 
Round 26: Liam Kay scored his 8th hat-trick for the Wolfpack.
Semi Final: Gareth O'Brien made his 50th appearance for the Wolfpack.
Semi Final: Ricky Leutele scored his 1st hat-trick for the Wolfpack.
Final: Ashton Sims made his 50th appearance for the Wolfpack.
Final: Blake Wallace scored his 50th try for the Wolfpack.

References

External links
Toronto Wolfpack

2019 in rugby league by club
2019 in Canadian rugby league
Toronto Wolfpack seasons